Channel 61 may refer to:

 Channel 61 (New Zealand TV channel), a regional television station based in Taupo, New Zealand
 RTV (Indonesian TV network), a local television station in Cikarang, Indonesia on UHF channel 61
 Zamora TV, a Venezuelan community television channel on UHF channel 61

United States
The following television stations, which are no longer licensed, formerly broadcast on analog channel 61:
 KQCT-LP in Davenport, Iowa
 WKBF-TV, an independent television station in Cleveland, Ohio 
 WLPN-LP (defunct), a low-power television station in New Orleans, Louisiana

See also
 Channel 61 branded TV stations in the United States
 Channel 61 virtual TV stations in the United States

61